Calocera viscosa, commonly known as the yellow stagshorn, is a jelly fungus, a member of the Dacrymycetales, an order of fungi characterized by their unique "tuning fork" basidia.

It has bright orange, yellow or occasionally white branching basidiocarps, which are somewhat gelatinous in texture and slimy to the touch (hence the specific name). It is relatively large for a jelly fungus, and can reach up to ten centimetres in height. It is widespread and common, and its bright colour makes it stand out in its habitat. It grows on decaying conifer wood, typically stumps and roots, although this may not be obvious if the wood is covered in leaf litter. It fruits throughout the year, but is most commonly seen in autumn.

It is not poisonous, but its tough gelatinous texture and nondescript taste and odour make it unattractive as a food. However, its striking colour has led to it being used as a garnish on occasion.

The species is difficult to identify without examination of microscopic features. Calocera cornea and Dacrymyces palmatus are related.

References

Dacrymycetes
Fungi of Europe
Fungi described in 1827